Chennai Super Kings (CSK) is a franchise cricket team based in Chennai, India, which plays in the Indian Premier League (IPL). They were one of the eight teams that competed in the 2014 Indian Premier League. They were captained for the seventh season in succession by Indian skipper Mahendra Singh Dhoni.

The Super Kings reached the play-offs of the 2014 IPL, and qualified for the 2014 Champions League Twenty20. They won their second Champions League title after defeating the Kolkata Knight Riders by 8 wickets in the final of the Champions League.

Background
Before the players mega-auction in 2014, the Super Kings retained five players: Mahendra Singh Dhoni, Suresh Raina, Ravindra Jadeja, Ravichandran Ashwin and Dwayne Bravo. The retention left them with a purse of INR21 crores to spend at the auction. At the auction, the franchise bought the likes of Brendon McCullum, Dwayne Smith, Faf du Plessis, Ashish Nehra, Mohit Sharma among others.

Squad
Players with international caps before the start of the 2014 IPL season are listed in bold.

Indian Premier League

Season standings

Match log

Most runs

Most wickets

Champions League Twenty20

Group standings

 Advanced to semifinals

Match log

Most runs

Most wickets

References

External links

Chennai Super Kings seasons
2014 Indian Premier League